Do Rzeczy (lit. To the point) is a Polish-language conservative and liberal weekly news and political magazine published in Warsaw, Poland. It often promotes the PIS party narrative.

History and profile
Do Rzeczy was established in January 2013 by Paweł Lisicki and a group of journalists who previously worked for the weekly magazine Uważam Rze. The magazine is published on a weekly basis and has its headquarters in Warsaw. It has a Christian and conservative-liberal stance.

Paweł Lisicki is also editor-in-chief of Do Rzeczy, which provides articles on political news.

See also
 List of magazines in Poland

References

2013 establishments in Poland
Conservatism in Poland
Conservative magazines
Magazines established in 2013
Magazines published in Warsaw
News magazines published in Poland
Polish-language magazines
Political magazines published in Poland
Weekly magazines published in Poland